Pterochroza ocellata, the peacock katydid, is an insect in the family Tettigoniidae. The species is a leaf-mimic katydid; when it is in repose its camouflage resembles a diseased or dead leaf. The katydid owes both its common name and its specific epithet (ocellata, meaning "marked with little eyes") to its startle display, in which it shows false eye spots on its normally hidden hind wings.

Characteristics
The adult Pterochroza ocellata is about 45mm to 65mm in length.  In its protective camouflage it resembles a dried leaf. If in spite of its camouflage it is threatened, the katydid exposes its hind wings, displaying two conspicuous eye spots.

No two individual Pterochroza ocellata are identical in their color pattern or the shape of the wings; this reduces the risk that predators could learn to recognize a fixed visual pattern. As in all katydids, their organs of hearing, or tympana, are on their front legs just below the joint between the femur and the tibia. The antennae are long, even for Tettigoniidae, being two to three times the length of the body.

Habitats
Pterochroza ocellata was described by Carl Linnaeus in the 18th century. In tropical regions such as northern South America, monkeys are among its major predators, actively searching for katydids by sorting through leaf litter.

Eating habits
The diet of Pterochroza ocellata includes plant and animal detritus, as well as fresh leaves. It is not a predator.

Reproductive behavior
As in most Tettigoniidae, the male attracts females with a high-pitched call, which it produces by rubbing one fore-wing over a scraper on the other fore-wing. This sound has been suggested to double as interference for the echolocation of bats, one of its many natural predators. When a female appears, the katydids first inspect each other with their antennae, then shake their bodies to gauge each other's size and strength. If the male does not retreat, the female will approach and they couple. Coupling lasts a few hours, during which the male will produce the spermatophylax and attaches it to the female's ovipositor. The spermatophylax is a gelatinous structure that contains the male's sperm cells as well as nutrients in the form of carbohydrates and proteins as a contribution towards the survival of the female and the offspring. The male's investment in the spermatophylax is considerable; it may exceed more than 20% of his body mass. The couple then separate and the female doubles over and consumes the spermatophylax.

References

External links
Pterochroza ocellata (Linnaeus, 1758), Orthoptera Species File
Pterochroza ocellata (Linnaeus, 1758), Encyclopedia of Life
Rare and Newly Discovered: Creepy Crawlies, Earth Rangers Wild Wire Blog, n.d. Web. 2013
Katydid, Encyclopædia Britannica Online, n.d. Web. 20 May 2013Encyclopædia Britannica
Conservation International has identified Guyana as the habitat for one of the 20 most unusual/rare species, Guyana Graphic, n.d. Web. 20 May 2013
Amazing Peacock Katydid, Save Our Green, n.d. Web. 20 May 2013
The Beautiful Katydids, Naskrecki, Piotr, n.d. Web. 20 May 2013
"Earth Rangers." Rare and Newly Discovered: Creepy Crawlies. N.p., 25 05 2011. Blog. 20 May. 2013
"Alonso, Leeanne, Jessica Deichmann, Sheila McKenna, Piotr Naskrecki, and Stephen Richards. "Rapid Assessment Program (RAP)." Conservation International. Chicago Press, n.d. Web. 20 May 2013
"True Facts About The Leaf Katydid." Amazing Videos. Amazing Videos Is Part Of The Great Stuff Network, 02 25 2013. Web. 21 May. 2013
"Katydid"

Tettigoniidae
Insects of South America
Insects described in 1758
Taxa named by Carl Linnaeus